Ballard County is a county located in the extreme west portion of the U.S. state of Kentucky. As of the 2020 census, the population was 7,728. Its county seat is Wickliffe and its largest city is LaCenter. The county was created by the Kentucky State Legislature in 1842 and is named for Captain Bland Ballard, a soldier, statesman, and member of the Kentucky General Assembly. Ballard County is part of the Paducah, KY-IL Micropolitan Statistical Area.

History
Ballard County was formed from portions of Hickman County and McCracken County. It was named for Bland Ballard (1761–1853), a Kentucky pioneer and soldier who served as a scout for General George Rogers Clark during the American Revolutionary War, and later commanded a company during the War of 1812. On February 17, 1880, the courthouse was destroyed by a fire, which also destroyed most of the county's early records. The county seat was transferred from Blandville to Wickliffe in 1882.

Geography

State protected area
Axe Lake Swamp State Nature Preserve is a  nature preserve located in Ballard County, in the Barlow Bottoms. The preserve is part of the  Axe Lake Swamp wetlands complex which supports at least eight rare plant and animal species. The site has been recognized as a priority wetland in the North American Waterfowl Management Plan.

Adjacent counties
 Pulaski County, Illinois (north) – across the Ohio River
 McCracken County (east)
 Carlisle County (south)
 Mississippi County, Missouri (southwest) – across the Mississippi River
 Alexander County, Illinois (west) – across the Ohio River

Demographics

As of the census of 2000, there were 8,286 people, 3,395 households, and 2,413 families residing in the county. The racial makeup of the county was 95.32% White, 2.87% Black or African American, 0.08% Native American, 0.18% Asian, 0.02% Pacific Islander, 0.08% from other races, and 1.44% from two or more races. 0.63% of the population were Hispanics or Latinos of any race.

There were 3,395 households, out of which 30.70% had children under the age of 18 living with them, 59.60% were married couples living together, 8.00% had a female householder with no husband present, and 28.90% were non-families. 25.80% of all households were made up of individuals, and 12.70% had someone living alone who was 65 years of age or older. The average household size was 2.39 and the average family size was 2.85.

The age distribution was 23.10% under the age of 18, 7.60% from 18 to 24, 27.70% from 25 to 44, 25.40% from 45 to 64, and 16.20% who were 65 years of age or older. The median age was 40 years. For every 100 females, there were 97.50 males. For every 100 females age 18 and over, there were 94.00 males.

The median income for a household in the county was $32,130, and the median income for a family was $41,386. Males had a median income of $32,345 versus $20,902 for females. The per capita income for the county was $19,035. About 10.70% of families and 13.60% of the population were below the poverty line, including 19.30% of those under age 18 and 15.40% of those age 65 or over.

Politics

Voter registration

Statewide elections

Communities

Cities
 Barlow
 Blandville
 Kevil
 LaCenter
 Wickliffe

Census-designated places
 Bandana
 Lovelaceville

Other unincorporated communities
 Ceredo
 Gage
 Hinkleville
 Ingleside
 Monkey's Eyebrow
 Needmore
 New York
 Oscar
 Slater
 Woodville

Notable people
 Morris E. Crain, Medal of Honor recipient for his bravery during World War II
 Kenny Rollins, an American basketball player who was a member of the University of Kentucky's "Fab Five" who won the 1948 NCAA Championship, the 1948 gold medal-winning U.S. Olympic Team, and the NBA's Chicago Stags and Boston Celtics
 Oscar Turner (1825–1896), state senator, U. S. representative and namesake of Oscar, Kentucky
 Earl Grace, Major League Baseball catcher for the Pittsburgh Pirates, Philadelphia Phillies, and Chicago Cubs

See also

 Dry counties
 National Register of Historic Places listings in Ballard County, Kentucky

References

 
1842 establishments in Kentucky
Populated places established in 1842
Kentucky counties
Kentucky counties on the Ohio River
Paducah micropolitan area
Kentucky counties on the Mississippi River